The Continental Cup 2006–07 was the tenth edition of the IIHF Continental Cup. The season started on September 22, 2006, and finished on January 7, 2007.

The tournament was won by Yunost Minsk, who led the final group.

The points system used in this tournament was: the winner in regular time won 3 points, the loser 0 points; in case of a tie, an overtime and a penalty shootout is played, the winner in penalty shootouts or overtime won 2 points and the loser won 1 point.

Preliminary round

Group A
(Bucharest, Romania)

Group A standings

Group B
(Belgrade, Serbia)

Group B standings *

* :  KHL Medveščak Zagreb was disqualified

First Group Stage

Group C
(Rouen, France)

Group C standings

Group D
(Kraków, Poland)

Group D standings

Group E
(Elektrėnai, Lithuania)

Group E standings

 Yunost Minsk     :  bye

Second Group Stage

Group F
(Minsk, Belarus)

Group F standings

 Alba Volán Székesfehérvár,
 Ilves,
 Avangard Omsk     :  bye

Final stage

Final Group
(Székesfehérvár, Hungary)

Final Group standings

References
 Continental Cup 2007

2006–07 in European ice hockey
IIHF Continental Cup